Henry Stapley (29 April 1883 – 29 April 1937) was an English amateur footballer who played for West Ham United and Glossop. Internationally, he played for the England amateur team and competed for Great Britain at the 1908 Summer Olympics, where he scored 6 goals.

Club career
Stapley played for Manor Park Albion, Bromley and Norwich CEYMS before joining Reading, where he played for the reserve and amateur teams. He then played for Woodford Town, where he was made captain, before signing for West Ham United, then of the Southern League, on 28 September 1905. He continued to play for Woodford Town after his signing.

Stapley made his West Ham debut against Portsmouth on 23 December 1905 and scored the only goal of the game. He spent three seasons at Upton Park and was the Irons' top scorer in all three, even though his job as a schoolteacher prevented him from traveling to certain midweek away games. In total, he scored 41 goals in 75 appearances.

He joined Second Division club Glossop in 1908 and continued his scoring record, ending as the club's top-scorer for seven consecutive seasons. He played 188 League games for Glossop, scoring 93 goals.

International career
Stapley made 14 appearances for the England amateur team, netting 28 goals, thus averaging two goals a game. Only Vivian Woodward has scored more goals for the amateur side than him with 44. Stapley's tally includes a 5-goal haul against the Netherlands in 1907, a 4-goal haul against the same opponents in 1908 and three hat-tricks against Belgium(2) and Sweden for a total of five trebles. Again, only Woodward has scored more hat-tricks for the amateur side than him with six. Stapley scored a further 6 goals in unofficial matches, which came in the form of two hat-tricks against Ireland to help his side with 6–1 and 5–1 wins, thus bringing his goal tally to 34 goals and his hat-trick tally to a record-breaking seven, since Woodward never scored one in an unofficial match.

In 1908, he was a member of the English amateur team that represented Great Britain at the 1908 Summer Olympics, winning the gold medal in the football tournament. He scored two goals in the first-round match, a 12–1 drubbing of Sweden, and scored all four in the semi-final against the Netherlands. He also appeared in the final against Denmark, helping his side with a 2-0 win. With these 6 goals, he is the second 'Highest British goal scorer within the Olympics' only behind Harold Walden who scored 9 in the 1912 Summer Olympics.

Outside football
Stapley tutored the sons of Glossop chairman Samuel Hill-Wood in football and cricket and saw three of his students attain blues in cricket at Oxford and Cambridge. He was later private secretary to Hill-Wood after his election as Member of Parliament for High Peak.

His brother, William Stapley, also played League football for Glossop.

International goals
England Amateurs score listed first, score column indicates score after each Stapley goal.

Notes

References

1883 births
1937 deaths
People from Southborough, Kent
Footballers from Kent
English footballers
England amateur international footballers
English Olympic medallists
Footballers at the 1908 Summer Olympics
Olympic footballers of Great Britain
Olympic gold medallists for Great Britain
Olympic medalists in football
Medalists at the 1908 Summer Olympics
Association football forwards
Bromley F.C. players
Reading F.C. players
Woodford Town F.C. (1937) players
West Ham United F.C. players
Glossop North End A.F.C. players
Southern Football League players
English Football League players
English civil servants